Citizen of Heaven is the second studio album by American Christian pop musician Tauren Wells, which was released via Capitol Christian Music Group on January 24, 2020. The album contains guest appearances by Steven Furtick, Jenn Johnson, Kirk Franklin and Rascal Flatts. The album was produced by Chuck Butler, Jordan Sapp, Kirk Franklin, Max Stark, Colby Wedgeworth, and Rascal Flatts.

The album was marketed by the release of four singles: "Like You Love Me", "Famous For (I Believe)", "Until Grace", and "Millionaire (Good Like That)".

Citizen of Heaven achieved commercial success in the United States, the album having debuted at No. 3 on Billboard's Top Christian Albums Chart, and at No. 169 on the mainstream Billboard 200 chart. The album won the GMA Dove Award for Pop/Contemporary Album of the Year at the 2020 GMA Dove Awards. Citizen of Heaven has garnered a Grammy Award nomination for Best Contemporary Christian Music Album at the 2021 Grammy Awards.

Music and lyrics
The album is primarily a Christian pop album, which contains various genres such as dance-pop, R&B, worship, gospel, Christian country. The sound on the album has been likened to Michael Jackson's style, especially on the songs such as "Miracle", "Millionaire (Good Like That)" and "Like You Love Me".

Release and promotion

Singles
"Like You Love Me" was serviced to Christian radio as the lead single from the album, impacting stations on December 13, 2019. "Like You Loved Me" peaked at No. 17 on the US Hot Christian Songs chart. On January 11, 2020, Wells released "Famous For (I Believe)" as the second single from the album. "Famous For (I Believe)" peaked at No. 3 on the US Hot Christian Songs chart. 

"Until Grace" and "Millionaire (Good Like That)" were released on February 14, 2020, as the third and fourth singles from the album.

Promotional singles
On September 20, 2019, Tauren Wells released "Miracle" as the first promotional single from the album, concurrently launching the album's pre-order. "Close" was released as the second promotional single from the album on October 11, 2019. On November 1, 2019, Wells released "Perfect Peace" as the third promotional single from the album. On November 29, 2020, Wells released "Like You Love Me" as the fourth and final promotional single from the album.

Critical reception

Izayab Thorb, reviewing for 24 Flix, opined that Wells "goes beyond the music and melody to deliver a diverse, yet uplifting message." In a positive review from 365 Days of Inspiring Media, Jonathan Andre lauded Wells, describing the album as being "dynamic and emotive as the first [Hills and Valleys], which was nothing short of powerful and unique." Jesus Freak Hideout's Josh Balogh stated in his review of the album: "Though the album isn't particularly innovative, it has many good things going for it. The production is crisp, the track listing is perfectly sequenced, guest vocals mostly deliver, everything is radio-ready, and it's fun to boot." Balogh that Citizen of Heaven was a slightly better album overall compared to Hills and Valleys. JubileeCaast's Timothy Yap gave a favourable review of the album, describing it as "Despite not being a perfect record, Citizen of Heaven is still a great Christian pop-centric record." NewReleaseToday's Jasmin Patterson praised the album, describing it as follows: "Citizen of Heaven is a top-notch pop album that will entertain you and help you connect with God at the same time. This one will be in your heavy rotation for months to come." Kelly Meade, indicating in a three-point-eight star review at Today's Christian Entertainment, says "Tauren's signature vocal style shines on this 13 track collection", concluding that the album is a "solid follow-up" to Hills and Valleys.

Accolades

Commercial performance
In the United States, Citizen of Heaven earned 6,000 equivalent album units in its first week of sales, and as a result debuted at No. 3 on the Top Christian Albums Chart dated February 8, 2020, the band's fifth chart-topping release on the tally. The album concurrently registered on the mainstream Billboard 200 chart at No. 169.

Track listing

Personnel
Adapted from AllMusic.

 Jacob Arnold – drums
 Traci Sterling Bishir – A&R
 Jimmy Bovyiand – baritone sax, tenor sax
 Antony Brown – bass
 Luke Brown – background vocals
 Chuck Butler – background vocals, engineer, instrumentation, producer, programming
 Lilly Butler – keyboards
 Allen Caren – guitar
 Nickle Contey – background vocals
 Steven Darling – programming
 Daifah Davies – background vocals
 Jay DeMarcus – bass, electric guitar, piano, programming
 Jason Eskridge – background vocals
 Cara Fox – cello
 Kirk Franklin – featured artist, producer
 Steven Furtick – featured artist
 Ethan Hulse – keyboards
 Jenn Johnson – primary artist, vocals
 Jeremy Johnson – piano
 Daniel Kinner – drums
 Gary LeVox – vocals
 Jeremy Lubsey – assistant
 Jason McArthur – background vocals, executive producer
 Vlado Meller – mastering
 Sean Moffitt – mixing
 David Navejas – art direction, design
 Jeff Pardo – piano
 Steve Patrick – trumpet
 Justin Raines – bass guitar
 Rascal Flatts – primary artist, producer
 Joe Don Rooney – background vocals, electric guitar
 Kevin Rooney – program assistant, programming
 Tim Rosenau – rhythm guitar
 Jordan Sapp – background vocals, engineer, instrumentation, mixing, producer, programming
 Keith Everette Smith – trumpet
 Mitchell Solarek – executive producer
 Max Stark – producer, programming
 Chris Strawder – percussion
 Rick Watford – electric guitar
 Colby Wedgeworth – background vocals, guitar, producer, programming 
 Kermit Wells – drums
 Tauren Wells – background vocals, keyboards, primary artist
 Alex Williams – guitar

Charts

Weekly charts

Year-end charts

Release history

References

External links
  on PraiseCharts

2020 albums